Jerome Edgar Horton (born September 14, 1956) is an American accountant and politician who was the member of the California Board of Equalization from the 3rd district from October 5, 2009 to January 7, 2019. He previously served as a member of the California State Assembly from 2000 until 2006.

Career
On July 15, 2009, Governor Arnold Schwarzenegger nominated Horton for the 3rd district of the California Board of Equalization to replace Judy Chu, who resigned from the board to become a member of the United States House of Representatives. Horton was confirmed by both houses of the legislature and sworn into office on October 5, 2009, at which point he was immediately elected the board's vice chair. On November 2, 2010, he was elected to his own four-year term. Horton served as chair of the board from 2011 to 2016.

On November 9, 2020, Horton announced his candidacy for the 2022 U.S. Senate election in California.

Antisemitism sentiment

An audit by the California Department of Finance of Horton's tenure as board chairman revealed missing funds and signs of nepotism, leading to calls for the governor to put the board under a public trustee. In June 2017, the California Department of Justice began a criminal investigation into the members of the board leading to Governor Jerry Brown stripping the board of most of its powers.

Electoral history

2010

2006

2004

2002

References

External links

Legislative website (archived)

Join California Jerome E. Horton

|-

1956 births
African-American state legislators in California
Living people
Democratic Party members of the California State Assembly
People from Los Angeles County, California
Politicians from Pine Bluff, Arkansas
21st-century American politicians
21st-century African-American politicians
20th-century African-American people